The 2023 FIBA Basketball World Cup qualification for the FIBA Asia-Oceania region began in November 2021 and concluded in February 2023. The process determined the six teams that would join the automatically qualified co-hosts the Philippines and Japan at the 2023 FIBA Basketball World Cup.

Entrants
The 16 teams that have qualified for the 2022 FIBA Asia Cup participated in the first round of the FIBA Basketball World Cup Asian qualifiers.

Format
In total, eight World Cup berths were allocated for the Asia-Oceania region. Two slots were automatically given to Philippines and Japan as co-hosts. The third co-host Indonesia did not have automatic qualification. Instead, it depended on their performance at the 2022 FIBA Asia Cup, which they hosted in July 2022. If the country finished in the top eight of the Asia Cup, they would automatically qualify for the World Cup as co-host and five slots from those qualifiers would be contested. If the country did not finish among the top eight, six slots were contested. In the end, Indonesia did not finish among the top eight, and six slots for the World Cup were contested. Despite automatic qualification, co-hosts competed in these qualifiers by virtue of qualifying to the 2022 FIBA Asia Cup.

The qualification structure is as follows:
First round: The 16 teams were divided into four groups of four teams to play double round-robin system (home-and-away matches). Three best placed teams from a group advanced to the second round.
Second round: The 12 teams were divided into two groups of six teams. Each group were formed from teams advanced from two first round groups. All results from the previous round were carried out. Six best placed teams (excluding automatic qualified co-hosts) from this round qualified for the World Cup.

Draw
The draw was held on 31 August 2021 in Mies, Switzerland.

Seeding
Seedings were announced on 30 August 2021. Teams were seeded based on geographical principles and FIBA rankings. Teams from pots 1, 3, 5, and 7 were drawn to Groups A and B, while teams from pots 2, 4, 6, and 8 were drawn to Groups C and D.

First round
The 16 teams qualified were divided into four groups of four teams. Each team faced the other teams in their group on a home-and-away basis over three windows. The top three teams from each group qualified for the next round. The 2023 hosts Japan and Philippines automatically qualified regardless of their final ranking in their respective groups.

All times are local.

Group A

Group B

Group C

Group D

Second round
The top three teams from all groups were grouped in two groups of six teams, where each team faced teams from another group. Results from the first round were carried. The top three teams from each group, along with hosts Japan and the Philippines, qualified for the World Cup.

All times are local.

Group E
As only three teams played in Group A, after the disqualification of South Korea, the result of the qualified teams from Group C against the last-placed team were not carried over.

Group F

Statistical leaders

Player averages

Team averages

Notes

References

External links
Tournament summary

FIBA Basketball World Cup qualification
2023 FIBA Basketball World Cup